Chungmuro is an avenue 1.75 km in length and 10–20 m in width and the area nearby, located in Jung-gu, central Seoul, South Korea. Since the 1960s, Chungmuro has been known as the street of culture, artists, and the film industry. Dansungsa, the first movie theater of Korea, established in 1907, is also situated in the area, then known by its Japanese name, Honmachi. Since 1974, Jongno 3-ga Station has become the nearest station around. Chungmuro was named after Chungmugong, the posthumous title of Korean Admiral Yi Sun-shin, which means "martial duke of loyalty." The last syllable "ro" refers to road in Korean.

History
During Japanese rule in Korea, Chungmuro was known as "Honmachi".

Although many film studios have since moved from Chungmuro to the Gangnam District or other areas of Seoul, Chungmuro still symbolizes the South Korean film industry and continues to be used as a metonym for it.

See also
Chungmuro station
Cinema of South Korea
Cinema of Korea

References

External links
Movie Street opens in Chungmuro at The Korean Overseas Culture and Information Service
Chungmuro fest wraps at the Variety
Rise of Korean Films Seen in World Cinema

Streets in Seoul
Neighbourhoods of Jung-gu, Seoul
Cinema of South Korea